Macedonian Airlines (transliterated Makedonikes Aerogrammes) was a subsidiary of Olympic Airways, the former national flag carrier of Greece. The company ceased operations in 2003, when it took over the operations of Olympic Airways and was renamed Olympic Airlines.

After the privatization of Olympic Airways and the formation of Olympic Air, it was announced by the new CEO Andreas Vgenopoulos that a subsidiary of the company will be established in Northern Greece bearing the name Macedonian Airlines. However, there have been no more official announcements about this to date.

History

1992–2003
Macedonian Airlines was created in 1992 as the charter subsidiary of the Greek national airline, Olympic Airways. The Olympic Airways management board decided to rename the charter subsidiary of the Group, Olympic AirTours in 1992, and the Macedonian Airlines brand name was created. The company had nothing to do with MAT Macedonian Airlines, which was founded two years later, in 1994, in neighbouring Republic of North Macedonia.

Macedonian followed the trails of its predecessor, Olympic AirTours, mainly for vacation planning until 1998. This year the airline acquired two B727-200 from Olympic Airways. Starting with these aircraft, Macedonian offered charter flights of the Greek islands and the mainland abroad European. The society had reached agreements with different large tour operators. One year later, in 1999, the airline used new aircraft, by leasing two B737-400 to replace the already aged Boeing 727s. Since the company was an Olympic Airways subsidiary, all maintenance and handling were operated by the parent company, Olympic Airways.

Until 2003, Macedonian's fleet was also used on OA scheduled services, especially after the older Boeing 737-200s were phased out. In July 2003, the company leased two McDonnell Douglas MD-82 that also used on charter flights. On 12 December 2003, due to the mounting problems of the Olympic Airways Group, a restructuring plan was formed. Macedonian Airlines was separated from the Group, renamed Olympic Airlines and took over all the data and flight operations of Olympic Airways (including the IATA and ICAO codes).

2010: Relaunch
On 1 October 2009, speaking after Olympic Air΄s inaugural flight in Thessaloniki, MIG΄s CEO Andreas Vgenopoulos said that Olympic Air will relaunch in the near future Macedonian Airlines. Mr. Vgenopoulos mentioned that Olympic Air holds the exclusive rights to the Macedonian Airlines brand name. Mr. Vgenopoulos said that Macedonian Airlines would be up-and-running in the coming two or three months while its first routes would include Germany and Amsterdam. There have been no more official announcements about this up until now.

Former fleet

References

External links

 Macedonian Airlines official site 
 Macedonian Airlines Virtual 
 Olympic Air 
 History of the Macedonian Airlines 
 MIG To Relaunch Macedonian Airlines

Defunct airlines of Greece
Airlines established in 1992
Airlines disestablished in 2003
Olympic Airlines
Greek companies established in 1992